Vehari railway station is located in middle of the Vehari, Punjab, Pakistan. The station is staffed and has a booking office.

Train routes
The routes are Vehari from linked with Lahore, Karachi,  Hyderabad, Rohri, Khanpur, Bahawalpur, Lodhran, Kasur, Raiwind, Arifwala, Rahim Yar Khan, Burewala, Nawabshah, Pakpattan, Mailsi,  and Gaggo.
The best railway system is near to Vehari in Khanewal which is such a large railway station and also have a junction.

Train services from Vehari

See also
 Pakistan Railways
 List of railway stations in Pakistan
 Quetta Railway Station
 Rawalpindi Railway Station
 Larkana Railway Station
Gujar Khan Railway Station
Mirpur Khas Railway Station

References

External links

Railway stations in Vehari District
Railway stations on Lodhran–Raiwind Line